"Could You Ever Love Me Again" is a 1973 song recorded by Gary and Dave.  It became their greatest hit, reaching #7 in Australia and #1 in Canada.  It was also a minor hit in the United States.

The song also charted on the Adult Contemporary charts of the U.S. and Canada.

Chart history

Weekly charts

Year-end charts

References

External links
 

1973 songs
1973 singles
Decca Records singles
Canadian soft rock songs
1970s ballads
RPM Top Singles number-one singles